Mozelle Alderson (November 20, 1904 – February 15, 1994) was an American classic female blues singer. She recorded a small number of tracks for Black Patti Records in 1927 and for Brunswick Records In 1930. Her most regular pianist was Judson Brown. She was a one-time vocalist for the Famous Hokum Boys in 1930 and toured and recorded as a backing vocalist for other blues artists. Alderson used a number of aliases, possibly including Kansas City Kitty, Hannah May, Thelma Holmes, Mae Belle Lee, and Jane Lucas.

Little is known of her life outside of her recording career.

Career
She was born Mozelle Fagans in Bedford, Ohio in 1904. She married and moved to Chicago, Illinois.

Alderson recorded three singles released by Black Patti Records in 1927, on which she was accompanied by the pianist Blind James Beck: "Mobile Central Blues", "Tall Man Blues", "Mozelle Blues", "State Street Special", "Sobbin' the Blues" and "Room Rent Blues". She recorded "Tight Whoopee" backed with "Tight in Chicago", released by Brunswick Records in 1930. The pianist Judson Brown accompanied her on the Brunswick recordings. She also recorded for the ARC and Vocalion labels.

Harum Scarums, a trio comprising Big Bill Broonzy, Georgia Tom and Alderson, recorded the two-part "Alabama Scratch" in Grafton, Wisconsin, for Paramount Records (Paramount 13054) in January 1931, and it was reported that it sounded "as if it was a real party."

The self-titled compilation album of the Famous Hokum Boys, issued in 2015 by JSP Records, includes the following in its credits: Mozelle Alderson, Scrapper Blackwell, Big Bill Broonzy, Georgia Tom, Frank Brasswell, Kansas City Kitty, Hannah May, and Arthur Petties.

Alderson was widowed by 1941. She married John Slocum in Chicago in 1943.

She died in Chicago in 1994, aged 89.

Her recordings are available on several compilation albums.

See also
List of classic female blues singers

References

1904 births
1994 deaths
20th-century African-American women singers
American blues singers
Classic female blues singers
People from Bedford, Ohio
20th-century American singers
Vocalion Records artists
Paramount Records artists
Brunswick Records artists
Singers from Ohio
20th-century American women singers